Red Sun Through Smoke is a studio album by Canadian musician Ian William Craig. It was released on March 27, 2020 under FatCat Records.

Critical reception
Red Sun Through Smoke was met with generally favorable reviews from critics. At Metacritic, which assigns a weighted average rating out of 100 to reviews from mainstream publications, this release received an average score of 80, based on 7 reviews.

Track listing

References

2020 albums
FatCat Records albums